Kontakt is a 2005 Macedonian film directed by Sergej Stanojkovski. It was Macedonia's submission to the 79th Academy Awards for the Academy Award for Best Foreign Language Film, but was not accepted as a nominee.

Cast
Nikola Kojo
Labina Mitevska
Petar Mircevski
Vesna Petrushevska
Necip Memili

See also
List of Macedonian submissions for the Academy Award for Best Foreign Language Film
List of submissions to the 79th Academy Awards for Best Foreign Language Film

References

External links

2005 films
Macedonian drama films
German romantic drama films
Macedonian-language films
2000s German-language films
2005 romantic drama films
2000s German films